Berault or Bérault may refer to:

Surname
Pierre Berault
Antoine Henri de Bérault-Bercastel, (1720–1794) French priest and Catholic historian

Given name
Bérault Stuart (c. 1452–1508) French soldier and diplomat; English: Bernard Stewart, 4th Lord of Aubigny

Places
Bérault (Paris Métro)

See also
Bernard